The 1984 Virginia Slims of Nashville was a women's tennis tournament played on indoor hard courts in Nashville, Tennessee in the United States that was part of the 1984 Virginia Slims World Championship Series. The tournament was held from January 2 through January 8, 1984.

Finals

Singles
 Jenny Klitch defeated  Pam Teeguarden 6–2, 6–1
 It was Klitch's only career title.

Doubles
 Sherry Acker /  Candy Reynolds defeated  Mary-Lou Daniels /  Paula Smith 5–7, 7–6, 7–6
 It was Acker's only career title. It was Reynolds' 1st title of the year and the 18th of her career.

External links
 ITF tournament edition details
 Tournament draws

Virginia Slims of Nashville
Virginia Slims of Nashville
Virginia Slims of Nashville
Virginia Slims of Nashville
Virginia Slims of Nashville